Thung Salaeng Luang National Park is a  national park in Phitsanulok and Phetchabun Provinces of Thailand. It encompasses substantial portions of Wang Thong and Lom Sak Districts.

Topography
Thung Salaeng Luang is inlaid with meadows, especially in the southern portions of the park. The park is the source of numerous streams. There are large salt licks at Pong Sai in the northwest and Pong Thung Phaya in the southwest. The Wang Thong River flows through the park.

History
Thung Salaeng Luang was proposed for inclusion in the national parks system In 1959. At the request of the Thai Army  were withdrawn from the national park. That is why a "new" national park area was created in 1972. Thung Salaeng Luang was "reestablished" as a national park on 27 May 1975, covering an area of 789,000 rai ~ . From the late-1960s to the early-1980s, the park's forest was used as a base for guerrillas of the Communist Party of Thailand.

Flora
The park features numerous forest types, including hill evergreen, conifer, tropical evergreen, dry evergreen, mixed deciduous and dry dipterocarp forest.
Plant species have a significant variety:
Evergreen species:

Dipterocarp species:

Deciduous species:

Flowering plant species:

Carnivorous plant species include:

Orchids species include:

Fauna
The number of sightings in the park are:
Mammals, include:

Birds, the park has some 170 species, of which some 115 species of passerine from 37 families, represented by one species:

and some 55 species of non-passerine from 20 families, represented by one species:

Reptiles, include:

Amphibians, include:

Fishes, include:

Butterflies, include:

Places

 Namtok Poi - a waterfall in Khao Krayang Forest park.
 Namtok Kaeng Sopha - a 3-tiered waterfall of the Wang Thong River.
 Namtok Phai Si Thong - a recently discovered 9-tiered waterfall.
 Namtok Kuhlab Daeng - a waterfall
 Lanphwai Kaeng Wang Nam Yen - a creek with hundreds of islets.
 Tham Duan and Tham Dao - caves.
 Tham Phra Rod-Maree - a cave.
 Tham Sai-Ngarm - a cave.
 Thung Non Son - a grassland with pinery and forest flowers.

Climate

Malaria
Historically, malaria has been a health issue in the park.

Effects of human presence
Communist insurgents as well as hill tribes and other intruders have destroyed some of the park's flora and fauna over the years.

Location

See also
 List of national parks in Thailand
 List of Protected Areas Regional Offices of Thailand

References

National parks of Thailand
Phetchabun Mountains
Tourist attractions in Phitsanulok province
Tourist attractions in Phetchabun province
Protected areas established in 1972
1972 establishments in Thailand